is a Japanese professional footballer who plays as an attacking midfielder or a forward for Bundesliga club Eintracht Frankfurt and the Japan national team.

Club career

Early career
Born in Ehime, Japan, Kamada began playing football at "Kids FC" (now FC Zebra Kids) and helped the side win TV Ehime Cup Ehime Prefectural Youth Soccer Championship U-12 when he was in 6th grade of elementary school. When Kamada was in junior high school, he then joined Gamba Osaka and was selected for the U-13 J League. However due to injuries, Kamada was released from the club and he returned to play school football, joining Higashiyama High School in 2012. Kamada quickly made an impact at Higashiyama, playing as an attacking midfielder. He went on to make 18 appearances and scored 22 at the end of the 2013 season.

In his third year at Higashiyama High School, Kamada was appointed captain, but they finished at the bottom of the league table with 2 wins and 13 losses. Despite this, he continued to impress, having scored ten goals, making him the fourth top scorer in the 2014 season. At the end of the 2014 season, having Kamada's performance at Higashiyama High School impressed many, he supposedly attracted interests from at least five J. League clubs following his graduation. On 17 November 2014, Kamada was announced as a new signing for Sagan Tosu for the 2015 season. Ahead of the 2015 season, he was given the number 24 shirt.

Sagan Tosu
At the start of the 2015 season, Kamada was loaned out to J.League U-22, where he made two appearances for the side. He made his Sagan Tosu debut, coming on as a 75th-minute substitute, in a 1–0 loss against Albirex Niigata in the J.League Cup on 8 April. A month later on 10 May, Kamada scored his first goal on his J.League debut, having come on as a 72nd-minute substitute, in a 1–1 draw against Matsumoto Yamaga. This was followed up by setting up the winning goal for Yohei Toyoda to help Sagan Tosu win 1–0. His first five appearances of the season earned him awarded New Hero Awards of the Yamazaki Nabisco Cup. He then set up two goals, in a 3–2 win against Kashiwa Reysol on 11 July. Eleven days later on 22 July 2015, Kamada scored his second goal of the season, in a 1–1 draw against Gamba Osaka. Having started out on the substitute bench, Kamada became a first team regular for the side, playing in the midfield position. Despite suffering an injury later in the 2015 season, he went on make twenty–eight appearances and score three times in all competitions.

Ahead of the 2016 season, Kamada signed a contract with the club. At the start of the season, Kamada played in midfield for the first seven matches. He also contributed two assists in two matches between 2 and 6 April against Kashiwa Reysol and Vegalta Sendai. Kamada, once again, awarded New Hero Awards of the Yamazaki Nabisco Cup. However during a match against Yokohama F. Marinos on 20 April, he suffered an elbow injury and was substituted as a result. Following this, it was announced on 22 April that Kamada was out for two weeks. It wasn't until 13 May when he returned to the starting line–up against FC Tokyo and played 55 minutes before being substituted, in a 0–0 draw. On 18 June, Kamada scored his first goals of the season, in a 2–1 win against Gamba Osaka. Since returning to the first team from injury, he regained his first team place for the rest of the season. Kamada scored twice in a 3–2 win against Kashiwa Reysol on 22 October. His goal against the club earned him J League Goal of the Month. By the end of the season, he made thirty–four appearances and scoring eight times in all competitions.

Ahead of the 2017 season, Kamada switched number shirt from twenty–four to seven. Kamada also signed a contract extension with the club. At the start of the season, Kamada continued to regain his first team place, playing in the midfield position. On 26 April, Kamada scored twice in a 4–4 draw against Cerezo Osaka in the J.League Cup. He made his last appearance of the season against Urawa Red Diamonds on 25 June, setting up the club's first goal of the game in a 2–1 win. In his final season, Kamada made 16 appearances, scoring three goals.

Eintracht Frankfurt
In June 2017, Kamada joined Bundesliga club Eintracht Frankfurt, signing a four-year contract running until 2021. The transfer fee was reported as €2.5 million.

Kamada made his Eintracht Frankfurt debut in the first round of the DFB–Pokal, starting a match and played 73 minutes before being substituted, in a 3–0 win against TuS Erndtebrück. In a follow–up match against SC Freiburg, he made his league debut for the club, starting a match and played 67 minutes before being substituted, in a 0–0 draw. However, Kamada found his first team opportunities at Eintracht Frankfurt, due to competitions and his own injury concern. Manager Niko Kovač said about his progress, saying: "Another reason for Daichi was that he is extraordinarily good in terms of ball technique and that he is very good in the gaps, which the opponent cannot really control moves. Unfortunately he got off a little bit badly because he was pushed away from time to time. You have to give him the time, he'll get that too." At the end of the 2017–18 season, he made four appearances in all competitions.

Sint-Truiden (loan)
In order to receive first team football, Kamada was loaned out to Belgian side Sint-Truiden for the rest of the 2018–19 season on 1 September 2018.

Kamada quickly made an impact for the club when he scored on his debut, in a 2–1 win against Gent on 16 September 2018. This was followed up by scoring in a 2–0 win against Royal Antwerp. Since making his debut for Sint-Truiden, Kamada quickly established himself in the first team, playing in either midfielder and striker positions. He then scored three consecutive goals in three matches between 6 October 2018 and 27 October 2018 against Royal Excel Mouscron, K.V. Kortrijk and Club Brugge. Kamada then scored four goals in three matches between 4 November 2018 and 25 November 2018, including a brace against Eupen on 10 November 2018. In the Group A league play-offs, Kamada later scored three goals, including a brace, in a 2–2 draw against Westerlo on 6 April 2019. At the end of the 2018–19 season, he went on to make 36 appearances and score sixteen times in all competitions.

Return to Eintracht Frankfurt

Since the start of the 2019–20 season, Kamada returned from a loan spell at Sint-Truiden and quickly became a first team regular for Eintracht Frankfurt, playing as a second striker. He then scored his first goal of the season, in a 5–3 win against Waldhof Mannheim in the first round of the DFB–Pokal. Manager Adi Hütter praised his performances, stating that Kamada has matured and presented himself differently. Kamada scored a brace in a 2–1 win against Arsenal in the UEFA Europa League match on 28 November. At the beginning of 2020, Kamada suffered a torn ligament that kept him out throughout January. Against Red Bull Salzburg in the second leg of UEFA Europa League's Round of 32 match, Kamada scored a hat–trick, in a 4–1 win. The club went on to progress to the next round of the UEFA Europa League following a 2–2 draw in the second leg. However, the season was suspended because of the COVID-19 pandemic and was pushed back to two months. Once the season resumed behind closed doors, Kamada  then scored his ninth goal of the season, as well as, setting up the club's first goal of the game, in a 3–3 draw against SC Freiburg on 26 May. This was followed up by scoring in a 2–1 win against VfL Wolfsburg. By the end of the season, Kamada had made 48 appearances and scoring sixteen times in all competitions, making him the club's third top scorer of the season. Following this, Frankfurt began talks with the player over a new contract. During the negotiation, manager Hütter wanted Kamada to stay, describing him as "a great, interesting player".

Three days before the start of the 2020–21 season, Kamada signed a contract extension with Frankfurt, keeping him until 2023, with manager Hütter played a factor to his decision. A week later against Hertha BSC on 25 September 2020, he played a key role to match by setting up two goals in a 3–1 win. In a follow–up match against Hoffenheim, Kamada scored his first goal of the season, in a 2–1 win. Since the start of the 2020–21 season, Kamada started in every match until he was dropped to the substitute bench for the last two matches of the year, with manager Hütter said the player needs to improve on his performance. In the second half of the season, Kamada continued alternating between a starting and a substitute role despite competing with Amin Younes. In a match against Bayern Munich on 20 February 2021, he played a key role to the match by scoring a goal and setting up a goal for Younes, in a 2–1 win. After missing one match due to lumbago, Kamada scored on his return from injury, in a 1–1 draw against RB Leipzig on 14 March. Despite scoring on his return, he played in the right–midfield position, which Manager Hütter acknowledged the negativity criticism from Frankfurter Rundschau, describing it as "a failed experiment". On 10 April, Kamada scored his fifth goal of the season and set up one of the goals, in a 4–3 win against VfL Wolfsburg. Despite failing to qualify for the UEFA Champions League next season, his contributions saw Eintracht Frankfurt qualify for the UEFA Europa League instead. At the end of the 2020–21 season, he had made 34 appearances and scored five times in all competitions.

At the start of the 2021–22 season, Kamada found himself alternating between a starting and a substitute role under the new management of Oliver Glasner. On 28 April 2022, he scored the winning goal in a 2–1 win over West Ham United in the first leg of the semi-finals of the Europa League. Eventually, Eintracht Frankfurt won the tournament after beating Rangers 5–4 on penalty shootouts in the final, in which he scored one of them.

In the 2022–23 UEFA Champions League group stage, he scored in the last three consecutive matches against Tottenham Hotspur, Marseille and Sporting CP, which helped his club to reach the knockout phase.

International career
Having previously called up to the Japan's youth team for the rest of 2015, Kamada was called up to the U21 squad the following year. He went on to make two appearances for the U21 side.

In March 2016, Kamada was called up to the Japan U23 squad for the first time. He made his Japan U23 debut, coming on as a 65th-minute substitute, in a 2–1 win against Mexico U23 on 25 March 2016. Kamada made his first starts for the Japan U23 side, and played 64 minutes before being substituted, in a 2–1 win against Guinea U23 on 25 May 2016. Kamada went on to make four appearances for Japan U23, with two other matches he featured were substitute.

Having previously failed to make a cut to the Samurai Blue squad for the 2019 AFC Asian Cup, it was announced on 15 March 2019 that Kamada was called up to the Japan squad for the first time. He made his debut for the Samurai Blue on 22 March 2019 in a friendly against Colombia, as a 79th-minute substitute for Takumi Minamino. Kamada then scored his first Japan goal, in a 6–0 win against Mongolia on 10 October 2019. Almost a year later, in October 2020, he was called up to the Samurai Blue squad. Kamada then scored three goals in three matches for Japan between 25 March 2021 and 28 May 2021 against South Korea, Mongolia and Myanmar.

On 1 November 2022, Kamada was named in the final squad for the 2022 FIFA World Cup in Qatar. He made his World Cup debut in Japan's 2–1 win over Germany, then reached the knockout phase with country after a 2–1 win over Spain.

Personal life
Kamada's father, Fukushige, was once a footballer and worked for the seniors and juniors at Osaka University of Physical Education. Because of his father's guidance, Kamada worked hard and learned how to use his body, enabling him to go back and forth between the attacking third and middle thirds, and his number of pass variations increased. He has a younger brother, Hiromu Kamada, who is also a footballer. In his free time, Kamada has said he is learning German and reads manga. Kamada credited teammate Makoto Hasebe for helping settle down in Germany.

At one point, Kamada considered going to university, saying: "Going to college may be a necessary path for me, but I still have a feeling that I can't give up. If I become a professional after graduating from college, I'm already 22 years old. However, I thought it would be very late to become a professional at the age of 22. For me, it is ideal that I go to the J League from high school and start from the first year, and I think I should do that. And I'm thinking about the future of the J League. I've always had a dream to go out into the world and play. I don't appreciate it, but I have enough confidence to do it." Growing up, Kamada said he wanted to be a footballer. On 25 May 2017, Kamada announced his marriage, to a woman he had been dating for a long time. A year later in October 2018, he became a first time father when his wife gave birth to a baby boy. Since moving to Eintracht Frankfurt, Kamada resides in the city with his family.

Career statistics

Club

International

Scores and results list Japan's goal tally first, score column indicates score after each Kamada goal.

Honours
Eintracht Frankfurt
 DFB-Pokal: 2017-18
UEFA Europa League: 2021–22
Individual
Japan Pro-Footballers Association awards: Best XI (2022)

References

External links

 
 
 Profile at Sagan Tosu
 

1996 births
Living people
Association football people from Ehime Prefecture
Japanese footballers
Japan international footballers
Japanese expatriate footballers
Japanese expatriate sportspeople in Germany
Japanese expatriate sportspeople in Belgium
J1 League players
J3 League players
Bundesliga players
Sagan Tosu players
J.League U-22 Selection players
Eintracht Frankfurt players
Belgian Pro League players
Sint-Truidense V.V. players
2022 FIFA World Cup players
UEFA Europa League winning players
Expatriate footballers in Belgium
Association football midfielders